The Masterpiece is a 64-floor, 261 metre (856 ft) tall skyscraper in Tsim Sha Tsui, Hong Kong. It houses the six-storey K11 shopping centre in the lower levels and basement. The 381-room Hyatt Regency hotel, located from Level 3 to 24, opened in October 2009. 345 luxury residential apartments occupy the 27th to 67th floors with penthouse apartment units located on the top floors of the building.

The complex is connected to both Tsim Sha Tsui and East Tsim Sha Tsui MTR stations via underground subway links with the K11 shopping centre.

History
The project was jointly developed by New World Development and the Urban Renewal Authority (URA). The building, along with other URA projects, has been criticized for its destruction of built heritage, and for damaging the existing community by contributing to gentrification which pushes out the less well-off.

Tenants

Hyatt Regency

The Hyatt Regency Hong Kong, Tsim Sha Tsui is a 381-room hotel located from levels 3 to 24 of the complex. It opened on 2 October 2009.

The hotel's predecessor was located two blocks west, on Nathan Road. Opened in 1964 as The President Hotel, it was renamed the Hong Kong Hyatt Hotel on 1 November 1969, the first Hyatt Hotel established outside of the United States. Later renamed the Hyatt Regency Hong Kong, the hotel closed on 1 January 2006, and was demolished. The site of the hotel is now occupied by iSQUARE, a 31-storey shopping mall.

All meeting facilities are equipped with audio-visual technology and wireless internet connectivity.

The hotel also houses four restaurants:

 Hugo's (established in the original location in 1969)
 The Chinese Restaurant
 Chin Chin Bar (established in the original location in 1964)
 Cafe

K11 Art Mall

It is marketed as an "art mall" as it incorporates various art displays.

See also
List of tallest buildings in Hong Kong

References

External links

 The Masterpiece official website
 Hyatt Regency Hong Kong, Tsim Sha Tsui official website
 K11 mall official website
 Emporis.com – The Masterpiece
 SkycraperPage.com – The Masterpiece

Hotels in Hong Kong
Residential skyscrapers in Hong Kong
Tsim Sha Tsui
Residential buildings completed in 2007
Hyatt Hotels and Resorts
Hotels established in 2009
New World Development